Kaoru Maruyama  was a Japanese poet. His collected works were translated by Robert Epp. He was the professor first in Tokyo and later at Aichi University. He was the editor of Four Seasons Literary Magazine. Ten Years, Fairy Country, and Heart of flowers are his best-known books. He is sometimes called "the poet of the sea".

Japanese male poets
1899 births
1974 deaths
20th-century Japanese poets
20th-century Japanese male writers